In mathematics, solid geometry or stereometry is the traditional name for the geometry of three-dimensional, Euclidean spaces (i.e., 3D geometry).

Stereometry deals with the measurements of volumes of various solid figures (or 3D figures), including pyramids, prisms and other polyhedrons; cubes; cylinders; cones; truncated cones; and balls bounded by spheres.

History

The Pythagoreans dealt with the regular solids, but the pyramid, prism, cone and cylinder were not studied until the Platonists. Eudoxus established their measurement, proving the pyramid and cone to have one-third the volume of a prism and cylinder on the same base and of the same height. He was probably also the discoverer of a proof that the volume enclosed by a sphere is proportional to the cube of its radius.

Topics

Basic topics in solid geometry and stereometry include:

 incidence of planes and lines
 dihedral angle and solid angle
 the cube, cuboid, parallelepiped
 the tetrahedron and other pyramids
 prisms
 octahedron, dodecahedron, icosahedron
 cones and cylinders
 the sphere
 other quadrics: spheroid, ellipsoid, paraboloid and hyperboloids.

Advanced topics include:
 projective geometry of three dimensions (leading to a proof of Desargues' theorem by using an extra dimension)
 further polyhedra
 descriptive geometry.

Solid figures

Whereas a sphere is the surface of a ball, it is sometimes ambiguous whether the term refers to the surface of the figure or the volume enclosed therein, notably for a cylinder. The following table includes major types of shapes that either constitute or define a volume.

Techniques

Various techniques and tools are used in solid geometry. Among them, analytic geometry and vector techniques have a major impact by allowing the systematic use of linear equations and matrix algebra, which are important for higher dimensions.

Applications
A major application of solid geometry and stereometry is in 3D computer graphics.

See also
 Ball regions
 Euclidean geometry
 Dimension
 Point
 Planimetry
 Shape
 Lists of shapes
 Solid modeling
 Surface
 Surface area
 Archimedes

Notes

References

Solid geometry